CNAV Eastore was a coastal auxiliary ship in service with the Royal Canadian Navy during World War II and the Cold War. Eastore, originally constructed as the United States Army Design 381 freighter FS-554, was acquired in 1944 and entered service with the Royal Canadian Navy in December of that year. The ship was paid off on 8 April 1946 and re-entered service as a naval auxiliary (CNAV). The ship remained in service with the Royal Canadian Navy until sold on 30 July 1964.

Description
During World War II, Eastore was armed with one  naval gun and two  cannon.

Service history
The ship was initially constructed for the United States Army as the coastal freighter FS-554. The ship was built by the Brunswick Marine Construction Company at their yard in Brunswick, Georgia, and was completed in November 1944. Transferred to the Royal Canadian Navy, the ship was renamed Eastore and commissioned on 7 December 1944. The ship was used as a supply vessel on the east coast of Canada during World War II. Eastore was paid off on 8 April 1946. Following the war, Eastore was redesignated a naval auxiliary (AKS) and given the prefix "CNAV". The vessel was sold on 30 July 1964. The ship's registry was deleted on 4 August 2010 due to the ship's existence being in doubt.

Citations

References
 
 
 

Auxiliary ships of the Royal Canadian Navy
Cold War naval ships of Canada
1944 ships